Preyer is a surname. Notable people with this surname include:

 Gottfried von Preyer (1807–1901), Austrian composer, conductor, and teacher.
 Johann Wilhelm Preyer (1803–1889),  German still life painter
 L. Richardson Preyer (1919–2001), jurist and a U.S. representative in Congress
 William Thierry Preyer (1841–1897), English-born physiologist who worked in Germany.

See also
 Prior (surname)
 Pryor
 Pryer